Yellow Dog is a live album by American folk singer/guitarist Greg Brown, released in 2007. It is from a benefit show in 2005 for the Upper Peninsula of Michigan's Yellow Dog Watershed.

Reception

Writing for Allmusic, music critic William Ruhlman  wrote of the album "Brown presents several "notebook songs," i.e., songs he has written recently in a notebook and not performed before. Not surprisingly, given the forum, he makes frequent references to Michigan and to environmental concerns, among other political issues." Steve Horowitz of PopMatters wrote the album " It's a typical Brown show. His low, rumbling voice exudes cool as he offers personal, matter-of-fact observations about life... He leads with his heart and lets his head follow."

Track listing
All songs by Greg Brown except where noted.
 "Intro"
 "Cold+Dark+Wet"
 "Dream Cafe"
 "Better Days"
 "Conesville Slough"
 "Oily Boys"
 "All of Those Things"
 "Canned Goods"
 "Pitchin' in"
 "Laughing River"
 "Please Don't Talk About Me When I'm Gone" (Sidney Clare, Bee Palmer, Sam H. Stept)

Personnel
Greg Brown – vocals, guitar
Seth Bernard – guitar
Drew Howard – pedal steel guitar
Dominic Suchyta – bass

References

Greg Brown (folk musician) live albums
2007 live albums